Dzyatlava District is a district (rajon) in Grodno Region of Belarus.

The administrative center is Dzyatlava.

Notable residents 
 Viačasłaŭ Adamčyk (1933, Varakomščyna village – 2001), Belarusian journalist, writer, playwright and screenwriter

References

 
Districts of Grodno Region